Oncidium praetextum is a species of orchid endemic to southern and southeastern Brazil.

References

External links 

praetextum
Endemic orchids of Brazil